The Bathurst Motor Festival is an annual motor racing event held at the Mount Panorama Circuit in Bathurst, New South Wales, Australia during the Easter long weekend. The event was first held in 2011 as a replacement for the Festival of Sporting Cars and as a way to give a higher number of drivers the opportunity to drive on the circuit. The event plays host to a variety of racing categories, including production cars, sports cars, open-wheel racing cars and historic cars, which take part in sprint races, endurance races and regularity sessions. Around 300 vehicles are entered for the event each year, with crowds of up to and over 10,000 people attending the event.  Car clubs also attend the event, displaying their cars within the confines of the circuit and performing parade laps. Since 2016, the Bathurst 6 Hour production car race has been the showpiece race of the event.

History
During the 2014 event, Formula 3 driver Simon Hodge set a new lap record for the circuit of 2:02.6701. Hodge's time remained as the lap record until the 2016 Liqui Moly Bathurst 12 Hour, where Shane van Gisbergen set a time of 2:01.567 in a McLaren 650S GT3.

During the 2016 event, Nathan Morcom and 2014 Bathurst 1000 winner Chaz Mostert won the inaugural Bathurst 6 Hour, which also saw the event's biggest weekend crowd to date. In winning the 2017 Bathurst 6 Hour, Paul Morris, driving with Luke Searle, became the first driver to win all of the three current major events at Mount Panorama; the 6 Hour, the Bathurst 1000, which he won in 2014 with Mostert, and the Bathurst 12 Hour, which he won in 2007 and 2010.

Racing categories
 

The following categories have raced at the Bathurst Motor Festival.

Bathurst 6 Hour

 

The Bathurst 6 Hour, currently known as the Hi-Tec Oils Bathurst 6 Hour for sponsorship reasons, is a race for Group 3E Series Production Cars and other invited cars that has been held as part of the Festival since 2016. The race is held on Easter Sunday, with practice and qualifying sessions taking place on the preceding two days.

History
The race is not to be confused with the 1962 Bathurst Six Hour Classic, a one-off event held for production touring and sports cars.

The Bathurst 12 Hour was an endurance race held for production cars from 1991 to 1995. It was revived in 2007 and continued as a production car-only race until 2010, before GT3 cars were made eligible for the race in 2011. Over the following years there was growing focus on the outright GT3 cars, while the number of production cars in the race declined. In April 2015, the former promoters of the 12 Hour, Yeehah Events, announced a six-hour race for Group 3E Series Production Cars, called the Bathurst 6 Hour, to be held at the Bathurst Motor Festival in 2016. Cars conforming to other regulations, such as V8 Utes and Saloon Cars, were also allowed to compete in the Invitational class.

The 2020 running of the race was postponed due to the COVID-19 pandemic and was to be part of the inaugural Bathurst International event in November, however this event, along with the 6 Hour, was eventually cancelled due to border closures within Australia arising from the pandemic. The 6 Hour returned to its traditional Easter date in 2021.

Class structure
Entrants in the Bathurst 6 Hour are divided into six classes:
 Class X: Ultimate Performance
 Class A1: Extreme Performance (Forced Induction)
 Class A2: Extreme Performance (Naturally Aspirated)
 Class B1: High Performance (Forced Induction)
 Class B2: High Performance (Naturally Aspirated)
 Class C: Performance
 Class D: Production
 Class E: Compact

Winners

 – Race record for laps & distance covered.

Multiple winners

By manufacturer

References

External links
 

Motorsport in Bathurst, New South Wales
Auto races in Australia